Kirishima (霧島) is a Japanese surname. It may refer to: 

 Kirishima City, a city in Kagoshima prefecture, Kyūshū, Japan
 Kirishima National Park, a Japanese national park in both Miyazaki and Kagoshima Prefectures on the island of Kyūshū
 Mount Kirishima, a highly active volcano in Kagoshima Prefecture
 Japanese battleship Kirishima, a battleship of the Imperial Japanese Navy, commissioned in 1915 and named after the volcano
 JDS Kirishima (DDG-174), a destroyer of the Japan Maritime Self-Defense Force commissioned in 1995
 Kirishima Kazuhiro, a retired Japanese sumo wrestler
 Kirishima (train), a train service in Japan
 Eijiro Kirishima, a character from the manga/anime series My Hero Academia
 Touka Kirishima and her brother Ayato Kirishima, characters from the manga/anime series Tokyo Ghoul
 Kanna Kirishima, a character from the video game series Sakura Wars

Japanese-language surnames